Kattenvenne station is a train station located in Kattenvenne, Lienen, in North Rhine-Westphalia, Germany.

History

The station is located on the Wanne-Eickel–Hamburg railway line. The train services are operated by WestfalenBahn.

Train services
The following services currently call at Kattenvenne:

Railway stations in North Rhine-Westphalia